Copenhagen is a play by Michael Frayn, based on an event that occurred in Copenhagen in 1941, a meeting between the physicists Niels Bohr and Werner Heisenberg. It premiered in London in 1998, at the National Theatre, running for more than 300 performances, starring David Burke (Niels Bohr), Sara Kestelman (Margrethe Bohr), and Matthew Marsh (Werner Heisenberg).

It opened on Broadway at the Royale Theatre on 11 April 2000 and ran for 326 performances. Directed by Michael Blakemore, it starred Philip Bosco (Niels Bohr), Michael Cumpsty (Werner Heisenberg), and Blair Brown (Margrethe Bohr). It won the Tony Award for Best Play, Best Featured Actress in a Play, Blair Brown, and Best Direction of a Play (Michael Blakemore).

In 2002, the play was adapted as a film by Howard Davies, produced by the BBC and presented on the Public Broadcasting Service (PBS) in the United States.

Summary
Three spirits come together to try to apprehend and explain one simple question: "Why did Heisenberg go to Copenhagen?" The rest of the play details information around this subject through argument and interjections.

Heisenberg – "No one understands my trip to Copenhagen. Time and time again I've explained it. To Bohr himself, and Margrethe. To interrogators and intelligence officers, to journalists and historians. The more I've explained, the deeper the uncertainty has become. Well, I shall be happy to make one more attempt."

Along the way, Heisenberg and Bohr "draft" several versions of their 1941 exchange, arguing about the ramifications of each potential version of their meeting and the motives behind it. They discuss the idea of nuclear power and its control, the rationale behind building or not building an atomic bomb, the uncertainty of the past and the inevitability of the future as embodiments of themselves acting as particles drifting through the atom that is Copenhagen.

Characters
In most dramas in which the characters are based on real people, there is a point at which the character deviates from the real person. However, playwright Michael Frayn worked to keep that distinction as small as possible. Having studied memoirs and letters and other historical records of the two physicists, Frayn felt confident in claiming that "The actual words spoken by [the] characters are entirely their own." With that in mind, the character descriptions apply to both the representative characters as well as the physicists themselves. There is a great amount known about all of the primary characters presented in Copenhagen; the following includes those bits of information which are directly relevant and referenced in the work itself.

Werner Heisenberg was born in 1901, in Würzburg, Germany. The son of a university professor, Heisenberg grew up in an environment with an intense emphasis on academics, but was exposed to the destruction that World War I dealt to Germany at a rather young age. He married Elisabeth Schumacher, also the child of a professor, and they had seven children. He received his doctorate in 1923 from the physicist Arnold Sommerfeld, and went to Copenhagen to study quantum mechanics with Niels Bohr in 1924, when he was 22, and replaced Bohr's assistant, H. A. Kramers. In 1926, The University of Leipzig offered  Heisenberg the opportunity to become Germany's youngest full professor. He is best known for his "Uncertainty Principle", (translated from the German Ungenauigkeit [inexactness] or Unschärfe [lack of sharpness] Relation, which was later changed to Unbestimmtheit meaning "indeterminacy".) In 1927, he and Bohr presented the Copenhagen interpretation of quantum mechanics. During the Second World War, Heisenberg worked for Germany, researching atomic technology and heading their nuclear reactor program. After the war, his involvement with the Nazis earned him certain notoriety in the world of physicists, mainly due to the fact that he could have given Germany the means to produce and use nuclear arms. He continued his research until his death in 1976 in Munich.
Niels Bohr was born in 1885, making him 38 when Heisenberg first came to work with him. He married Margrethe Norlund in 1912 in Copenhagen and together they had six sons, two of whom died while young. Biographer Harry Lustig notes that "Most of the world's great theoretical physicists... spent periods of their lives at Bohr's Institute." Before the war, his research was instrumental in nuclear research, some of which led to the building of the atomic bomb. During the war, however, Bohr was living in occupied Denmark and somewhat restricted in his research; he escaped to Sweden in 1943, just before an SS sweep which would have targeted him through his Jewish heritage. In the US, he worked in Los Alamos on the atomic bomb until the end of the war. He died in 1962 and was survived by his wife, Margrethe.
Margrethe Bohr, known later in her life as Dronning or "Queen" Margrethe, was born in 1890 in Denmark. She was closely involved in her husband's work; he would commonly bounce ideas off of her, trying to explain them in "plain language". She died in 1984, survived by several of her children. Her son Hans wrote, "My mother was the natural and indispensable centre. Father knew how much mother meant to him and never missed an opportunity to show his gratitude and love.... Her opinions were his guidelines in daily affairs."

Style
The construction of the plot is non-linear, seeing as it does not exist in time and space. Sometimes one character will not notice that there are other people in the space, and speak as if to no one. The world that Frayn presents is outside of our conceptions as audience members, simply by virtue of the fact that no one attending the play has ever died. So the world in which Copenhagen is based is somewhere between heaven and an atom.

It can also be thought to exist "inside the heads" of the characters present. It is a subjective world, taking and manipulating history, picking apart some events and mashing others together to better compare them. The characters are all plagued by some form of guilt or another, particularly in reference to the atomic bomb, and they are trapped in this world, doomed to forever speculate on that evening in Copenhagen in 1941 to determine how the world might have been changed. These are all traits of the artistic style known as Expressionism.

In his preface to A Dream Play, August Strindberg notes that in these worlds, "everything is possible and probable. Time and space do not exist. Working with... real events as a background, the imagination spins out its threads of thoughts and weaves them into new patterns." Copenhagen is an embodiment of these principles.

Recurring images and motifs
Because the concepts in physics and politics are at times very complicated or very abstract, Frayn uses several controlling images to better relate certain ideas to his audience.

• Skiing and Table-Tennis – These two activities are referred to as a pastime of Bohr and Heisenberg's, and both demonstrate the competition between the two (representative of national competition.) They are also used to suggest Heisenberg's speed and recklessness which contrasts with Bohr's caution and tediousness.

• Invisible Straight – An anecdote in which Bohr managed to bluff himself in a game of poker by betting on a straight that he thought he had, but he really did not. That principle is applied to nuclear weaponry, suggesting that nations will act differently when they think that an opponent can produce nuclear arms, whether or not the opponent can.

• Cap-Pistols, Land Mines and Nuclear Reactors – These fall into the Toy vs. Weapon theme and once again presents anecdotes of Bohr and Heisenberg's lives. Their fascination in playing with the new toy blinds them to the danger that it poses.

• Bomb – The term "bomb" appears as a literal looming image in many cases, but it is used figuratively in a couple of instances, as if it should be a joke, but with such grave implications that it cannot be found funny. (For example, Heisenberg refers to a "bomb having gone off" in Bohr's head.)

• Christian Reaching for the Life-Buoy – Christian was one of Bohr's sons, who tragically drowned while he and Bohr were out sailing. The phrase "Christian reaches for the life-buoy" appears several times during the play, and every time, the characters seem to hold their breath in the hope that this time, Christian will survive. Bohr had concluded that they would have both drowned had he jumped in to save his son, which presents an idea of futile heroics, particularly with reference to Heisenberg and what should happen if he were to resist Hitler's rule.

• "Another Draft" – Whenever the characters conclude that an interpretation of their 1941 meeting is incorrect, they call for "another draft".

Language
Though the dialogue does not contradict logic, it cannot be called realistic in the strictest sense. One character's line might fade into the next as though the second person knew exactly what he was going to say; sometimes a character will slip into a memory and partially relive a former or younger self in a monologue; and over the course of the show, there is a definite ambiguity as to whether they are speaking to one another or to the audience.

The play was originally written in English, but the real people in the exchange may have had the conversation in Danish or German, but even with translation in mind, Frayn defends that the words in the script are those that the characters would actually say. In his post-script, he writes, "If this needs any justification, I can only appeal to Heisenberg himself." Understandably, Frayn needs to present the characters in an interesting and dramatic light, as well as depicting a setting that no living person has visited, so the accuracy of such dialogue is subject to dwindle by degrees.

Plain language and scientific language both operate in the play. There are several instances when the two physicists start speaking too scientifically for many people to understand, and one of them will remark that they must revert to plain language, to explain it in a way that Margrethe will understand. Even for that effort, criticism arose about the complexity of the play and the difficulty for viewers to comprehend. A writer for The Commonweal commented on the Broadway premiere, saying that "the play's relentless cerebral forays can... be frustrating."

Production history
London Premiere – 1998

Copenhagen opened in the National Theatre in London and ran for more than 300 performances, starring David Burke as Niels Bohr, Sara Kestelman as Margrethe Bohr, and Matthew Marsh as Werner Heisenberg. It was directed by Michael Blakemore.

"Copenhagen" transferred to the Duchess Theatre in London's West End, where it ran from 8 February 1999, for more than 750 performances. It had a "second" cast when it opened in the West End, who were responsible for performing at least one of the matinee shows each week. The second cast consisted of David Baron as Niels Bohr, Corinna Marlowe as Margarethe Bohr, and William Brand as Werner Heisenberg, and after six months, they replaced the original cast for the rest of the West End run.

Broadway Opening – April 2000

Continuing under the direction of Michael Blakemore, it opened on Broadway at the Royale Theatre on 11 April and ran for 326 performances. Starring Philip Bosco as Bohr, Michael Cumpsty as Heisenberg and Blair Brown as Margrethe, it went on to win the Tony Award for Best Play, along with two others for Best Featured Actress in a Play (Blair Brown), and Best Direction of a Play (Michael Blakemore). But even for its success, Frayn admitted in an article that "A number of commentators expressed misgivings about the whole enterprise." Several critics noted that it was heavy with scientific dialogue, a little too heavy for the common audience. Though a writer from Physics World hailed it as "brilliant theatre ", a Charles Spencer, of the Daily Telegraph, wrote, "I felt that my brain was being stretched to breaking point—well beyond breaking point, in fact."

International Productions

1999 - France
 At the Théâtre Montparnasse (Paris). Adapted by Jean-Marie Besset, directed by Michaël Blakemore and with Pierre Vaneck, Niels Arestrup and Maïa Simon, the play won four Molière Prizes.
2001 - Finland

 At the Helsinki City Theatre, featuring Hannu Lauri, Mika Nuojua and Leena Uotila, directed by Neil Hardwick based on a translation by Petri Friari, opened on October 18, 2001.

2002 - Argentina
 At the Teatro Municipal General San Martín (Buenos Aires), with Juan Carlos Gené, Alberto Segado and Alicia Verdaxagar. It was directed by Carlos Gandolfo. It ran for four consecutive years and is considered one of the biggest hits in the history of that theatre.

2003 - Spain 
 By Fila Siete y Armonía Production in Madrid in April 2003 withFernando Delgado, Juan Gea and Sonsoles Benedicto. It was directed by Román Calleja.

2017 - Italy
 At the Teatro Argentina (Roma). Translated by Filippo Ottoni and Maria Teresa Petruzzi, directed by Mauro Avogadro, with Umberto Orsini, Giuliana Lojodice and Massimo Popolizio. National touring in 2018.

2019 - Spain
 It opened 15 February in Avilés. After touring the country, it will open in Madrid 23 May at the Teatro de la Abadia. Produced by PTC and directed by Claudio Tolcachir, the cast includes Emilio Gutiérrez Caba, Carlos Hipólito and Malena Gutiérrez.

2022 - Turkey
 A 75-minute single-act adaptation premiered on December 8, 2022 at the "K! Kültüral Performing Arts" theatre in Istanbul. Translated to Turkish and directed by Noyan Ayturan, the cast includes Umut Beşkırma as Heisenberg, Yaman Ceri as Niels Bohr, and Burcu Ger as Margrethe Bohr.

TV Movie – 2002

The play was adapted as a television movie in 2002, with Daniel Craig as Heisenberg, Stephen Rea as Niels Bohr, and Francesca Annis as Margrethe Bohr. The movie substantially cuts down the script of the play, eliminating several recurring themes, and most of the material that established the community of scientists in Copenhagen. It also abandons the abstract staging of the theatrical version in favour of being set in the city of Copenhagen, in Bohr's old house.

Recent revivals

The play has had many productions and revivals, including:
 Royal Lyceum Theatre in Edinburgh, with Tom Mannion as Niels Bohr, Sally Edwards as Margrethe Bohr, and Owen Oakeshott as Werner Heisenberg. It was directed by Tony Cownie.
 the New Vic Theatre in Staffordshire with John O'Mahony as Niels Bohr, Jamie Hinde as Heisenberg and Deborah Maclaren as Margrethe Bohr. It was directed by James Dacre.
The Living Theatre in New York City with Lou Vuolo as Bohr, Mary Ann Hay as Margrethe, and Keith Herron as Heisenberg. It was directed by Anne Pasquale.
 The Lyceum theatre in Sheffield with Henry Goodman as Niels Bohr, Geoffrey Streatfeild as Werner Heisenberg and Barbara Flynn as Margrethe. It was directed by David Grindley.
 Ranga Shankara in Bangalore with Prakash Belawadi as Niels Bohr, Nakul Bhalla as Werner Heisenberg and Sharanya Ramprakash/Rukmini Vijayakumar as Margrethe. It was directed by Prakash Belawadi.
 Pratyay Amateur Theatre Art Centre (प्रत्यय हौशी नाट्य कला केंद्र, कोल्हापूर) of Kolhapur (Maharashtra State, India), in Marathi translation by Dr Sharad Navare (शरद नावरे), directed by Dr Sharad Bhuthadiya (शरद भुथाडिया), with Sagar Talashikar (सागर तळाशीकर) as Werner Heisenberg, Dr Sharad Bhuthadiya as Niels Bohr and Meghana Khare (मेघना खरे) as Margrethe.
 Oxford University's The Michael Pilch Studio Theatre in October 2016 with Rupert Stonehill as Heisenberg, George Varley as Bohr and Miranda Collins as Margrethe. It was produced by Emma Irving, directed by Archie Thomson, and assistant directed by Jack Cammack.
 The Lantern Theatre in Philadelphia, Pennsylvania., directed by Kittson O'Neill, with Charles McMahon as Heisenberg, Sally Mercer as Margrethe Bohr, and Paul L. Nolan as Niels Bohr.
Indra’s Net Theater in Berkeley, CA, with Aaron Wilton as Heisenberg, Nancy Carlin as Margrethe Bohr, and Robert Ernst as Niels Bohr, directed by Bruce Coughran.

Radio – January 2013

Adapted and directed by Emma Harding for BBC Radio 3 starring Benedict Cumberbatch as Werner Heisenberg, Greta Scacchi as Margrethe Bohr and Simon Russell Beale as Niels Bohr.

 Balch Arena Theater at Tufts University with Artoun Festekjian as Niels Bohr, Maya Grodman as Margrethe Bohr, and Alex Kaufman as Werner Heisenberg. It was directed by Michael Roubey. February 2013

Awards and honours 
 Evening Standard Award for Best Play (winner, 1998)
 Molière Award for Best New Play (winner, 1999)
 Drama Desk Award for Outstanding Play (winner, 2000)
 New York Drama Critics' Circle for Best Foreign Play (winner, 2000)
 Tony Award for Best Play (winner, 2000)

Historical debate
The meeting took place in September 1941 when Bohr and Heisenberg were 55 and 39, respectively. Heisenberg had worked with Bohr in Copenhagen for several years starting in 1924.

Heisenberg historians remain divided over their own interpretations of the event. Frayn's 1998 play brought more attention to what previously had been a primarily scholarly discussion. A collection of historical essays provoked by the play was published in English in 2005.

Much of the initial controversy stemmed from a 1956 letter Heisenberg sent to the journalist Robert Jungk after reading the German edition of Jungk's book, Brighter than a Thousand Suns (1956). In the letter, Heisenberg described how he had come to Copenhagen to discuss with Bohr his moral objections toward scientists working on nuclear weapons but how he had failed to say that clearly before the conversation came to a halt. Jungk published an extract from the letter in the Danish edition of the book in 1956 that, out of context, made it look as if Heisenberg was claiming to have sabotaged the German bomb project on moral grounds. (The letter's whole text shows Heisenberg was careful not to claim that.) Bohr was outraged after reading the extract in his copy of the book, feeling that it was false and that the 1941 meeting had proven to him that Heisenberg was quite happy to produce nuclear weapons for Germany.

After the play inspired numerous scholarly and media debates over the 1941 meeting, the Niels Bohr Archive in Copenhagen released to the public all sealed documents related to the meeting, a move intended mostly to settle historical arguments over what they contained.
Among the documents were the unsent letters Bohr drafted to Heisenberg in 1957 about Jungk's book and other topics.

These drafts proved to be significant in several respects. First, they proved to be relatively consistent with Heisenberg's recollections of the meeting given to Jungk in 1956, meaning that the course of the conversation can now be fairly well established. Bohr and Heisenberg agree that Heisenberg started the visit by stating to Bohr that nuclear weapons were now conceivable. As Heisenberg wrote to Jungk,
This talk probably started with my question as to whether or not it was right for physicists to devote themselves in wartime to the uranium problem – as there was the possibility that progress in this sphere could lead to grave consequences in the technique of the war.
Bohr confirms that by writing,
It had to make a very strong impression on me that at the very outset you stated that you felt certain that the war, if it lasted sufficiently long, would be decided with atomic weapons.

Heisenberg repeated his convictions on the technical feasibility of building nuclear weapons. As Heisenberg recalled: He [Bohr] replied as far as I can remember with a counter-question, "Do you really think that uranium fission could be utilized for the construction of weapons?" I may have replied: "I know that this is in principle possible, but it would require a terrific technical effort, which, one can only hope, cannot be realized in this war."  Bohr was shocked by my reply.  Bohr's draft letters are consistent with this: 
I did not respond to this at all, but as you perhaps regarded this as an expression of doubt, you related how in the preceding years you had devoted yourself almost exclusively to the question and were quite certain that it could be done...
That point is of interest because it is at odds with the suggestion by critics that miscalculations by Heisenberg had led him to conclude erroneously that atomic weapons were not feasible.  According to Bohr's later notes, Heisenberg then told Bohr that he had not come to discuss the technical aspects of the potential weapons:
Heisenberg said explicitly that he did not wish to enter into technical details but that Bohr should understand that he knew what he was talking about as he had spent 2 years working exclusively on this question.

Unfortunately, because of Heisenberg's concerns about being monitored, his discussion of any details of Germany's nuclear efforts with someone in an occupied country would have been illegal, his remarks were cryptic. Indeed, Bohr's letters note that Heisenberg spoke "in vague terms", from which Bohr was able to form only an "impression" about Heisenberg's efforts.
Bohr wrote:

I listened to this without speaking since [a] great matter for mankind was at issue in which, despite our personal friendship, we had to be regarded as representatives of two sides engaged in mortal combat. That my silence and gravity, as you write in the letter, could be taken as an expression of shock at your reports that it was possible to make an atomic bomb is a quite peculiar misunderstanding, which must be due to the great tension in your own mind. From the day three years earlier when I realized that slow neutrons could only cause fission in Uranium 235 and not 238, it was of course obvious to me that a bomb with certain effect could be produced by separating the uraniums. In June 1939 I had even given a public lecture in Birmingham about uranium fission, where I talked about the effects of such a bomb but of course added that the technical preparations would be so large that one did not know how soon they could be overcome. If anything in my behaviour could be interpreted as shock, it did not derive from such reports but rather from the news, as I had to understand it, that Germany was participating vigorously in a race to be the first with atomic weapons.

That circumspect discussion, combined with Bohr's shocked reaction to it, apparently cut off the discussion between them. Thus, the Bohr letters cannot resolve the question, posed by the Copenhagen play, of what Heisenberg had tried to convey to Bohr.

Heisenberg's comment that he knew about the potential for weaponizing uranium fission, appears to counter the arguments of critics such as Rose and Bernstein that calculation errors in 1940 about feasibility, rather than moral scruples, led Heisenberg not to pursue building nuclear weapons.

Finally, the 1957 Bohr draft letters, written 16 years after the meeting, suggest a conflict between Bohr and Heisenberg. Heisenberg's letter to his wife, written on the eve of his departure from Copenhagen, provides no hint of a fracture. In it, he related his final evening with Bohr as very pleasant and unremarkable: "Today I was once more, with Weizsäcker, at Bohr's. In many ways this was especially nice, the conversation revolved for a large part of the evening around purely human concerns, Bohr was reading aloud, I played a Mozart Sonata (a-Major)."

In a March 2006 interview Ivan Supek, one of Heisenberg's students and friends, commented that "Copenhagen is a bad play" and that "Frayn mixed up some things". Supek also claimed that Weizsäcker was the main figure of the meeting. Allegedly, "Heisenberg and Weizsäcker came to Bohr wearing German army uniforms. Weizsäcker tried to persuade Bohr to mediate for peace between Great Britain and Germany and Heisenberg practically completely relied on his political judgement". Supek received these details in a confidential conversation with Margrethe, who thought he would never make them public. Supek however felt it was "his duty to announce these facts so that future generations can know the truth about the Bohr – Heisenberg meeting".

Supek's statements about Bohr's recollection of "the Bohr – Heisenberg meeting" mixes up the visit. Because Heisenberg could only visit Bohr in occupied Denmark on behalf of the German government, Heisenberg was obliged to make public lectures on behalf of the Government which were monitored by German government officials. Heisenberg tried to convey his opinions later during private discussions with Bohr. Heisenberg's letters to his wife and later to Jungk place his conversation with Bohr on Wednesday evening.  Either he talked with Bohr on a walk, or at his residence. Bohr, Supek, and Heisenberg describe the meeting differently.

Physicists referenced
Over the course of the play, a number of renowned physicists are mentioned. Many of them are referenced in the context of their work with either Bohr or Heisenberg. This is the order they appear in the script:

Max Born
Pascual Jordan
Carl von Weizsäcker
Rozental Petersen
Christian Møller
Samuel Goudsmit
Albert Einstein
Wolfgang Pauli
Otto Frisch
Lise Meitner
Arnold Sommerfeld, Max von Laue, and Karl Wirtz
Otto Hahn – credited with the discovery of fission
Fritz Strassmann
Enrico Fermi
John Wheeler
Robert Oppenheimer
Erwin Schrödinger
Hendrik Casimir
George Gamow
Oskar Klein
James Chadwick
Victor Weisskopf
Fritz Houtermans
Edward Teller
Leó Szilárd
Paul Dirac
H.A. Kramers
George Uhlenbeck
Rudolph Peierls

See also
Deutsche Physik
Doctor Atomic
History of nuclear weapons
Operation Alsos (postwar attempt to gauge the progress of the German bomb project)
Operation Epsilon
Manhattan Project (Allied wartime bomb project)
Uranverein (Nazi wartime bomb project)

References

Notes

Bibliography
Cassidy, David C. Uncertainty: the Life and Science of Werner Heisenberg. W. H. Freeman and Company, New York, NY. 1992.
Frayn, Michael. Copenhagen. New York City. Anchor Books: Random House, Inc. 2000.
Lustig, Harry. "Biographies of Persons in Copenhagen." City University of New York Graduate Center: American Social History Project.
Rush, David. A Student Guide to Play Analysis. Southern Illinois Printing Press, 2005. Carbondale, IL
Spencer, Charles. review of Copenhagen in The Daily Telegraph, in The Complete Review. Accessed 2-25-09.
Ziman, John. review of Copenhagen in Physics World, in The Complete Review. Accessed 2-25-09.
Zoglin, Richard, review of Copenhagen in Time, in The Complete Review. Accessed 2-25-09.

External links
 
 
 Review from the American Institute of Physics
 Documents relating to the 1941 meeting released in 2002 by the Niels Bohr Archive
 American Repertory Theatre's production, directed by Scott Zigler
 Michael Frayn's Copenhagen in Debate: Historical Essays and Documents on the 1941 Meeting between Niels Bohr and Werner Heisenberg
 Copenhagen Symposium at the Graduate Center of the City University of New York
Heisenberg wanted to help Bohr. A new document about the meeting of the two physicists in Copenhagen in 1941. (in German) In: Berliner Zeitung, 5 April 2002

Plays by Michael Frayn
Biographical plays about scientists
Plays based on actual events
Plays about World War II
Plays set in Copenhagen
Cultural depictions of physicists
Fiction about nuclear war and weapons
1998 plays
Broadway plays
British plays adapted into films
Copenhagen in fiction
Fiction set in 1941
Drama Desk Award-winning plays
New York Drama Critics' Circle Award winners
Tony Award-winning plays
Werner Heisenberg
Niels Bohr